Total Siyapaa is a 2014 Indian Hindi-language romantic comedy film directed by Eeshwar Nivas and written by Neeraj Pandey. The screenplay is based on that of the Spanish-Argentine film Only Human, written and directed by Dominic Harari and Teresa Pelegri. The main characters in the original film are Israeli and Palestinian while in Total Siyapaa, they are Indian and Pakistani.

It was distributed by Reliance Big Entertainment across 850 theatres in India with two other films: Gulaab Gang and Queen. The film opened on a similar note with Queen in multiplexes, offering stiff competition to each other owing to a similar release count.

The film stars Ali Zafar and Yami Gautam in lead roles with Anupam Kher and Kirron Kher in supporting roles, who appeared for the first time as an on-screen couple. The first look of the film along with that of Holiday: A Soldier Is Never Off Duty was launched on the Zee Cine Awards.

Gada-owned Pen India acquired the film rights from Reliance Entertainment while & Pictures acquired 50 per cent equity of the satellite rights. Reliance and Zee Network own the film's overseas and promotional rights respectively. Consequently, Reliance and Gada decided to postpone the release date to 7 March 2014 from 30 January 2014 to promote it. Upon release, Total Siyapaa received generally negative reviews from critics and did not perform well financially.

Plot
Settled in London, Aman, a Pakistani musician, hopes to marry Asha, an Indian woman also living in London with her family. He visits her parents' house to seek their permission to marry her. However, his plans to impress the Punjabi family start failing when they discover that he is Pakistani. During the course of events "total chaos" happens.

Cast 
 Ali Zafar as Aman
 Yami Gautam as Asha Singh
 Anupam Kher as Rajinder Singh, Asha's father
 Kirron Kher as Asha's mother
 Sara Khan as Jia Singh, Asha's sister
Arshpreet Kaur as Anjali Singh, Jia’s daughter 
 Vishwa Mohan Badola as Daddu, Asha's grandfather
 Anuj Pandit Sharma as Manav Singh, Asha's brother
 Barrie Martin
 Sandeep Londhe as friend of Manav

Critical reception 
Total Siyapaa received mostly negative reviews, with critics suggesting skipping it. Reviews of the performances were mixed, with the Hindustan Times lauding it; the Deccan Chronicle and Bollywood Life criticized Ali Zafar's and Yami Gautam's performances, respectively. Kirron Kher's performance was seen as one of the strong points. The lack of a solid plot, the lack of attention to detail and poor comic timing were seen as major drawbacks. The film was largely seen as unfunny and not living up to the trailer.

Box office reception
Total Siyapaa received a low opening with poor box office reception in India due to negative reviews from critics. However, the film did better overseas, being positively received in Pakistan and the United Arab Emirates.

Soundtrack

The album is sung and composed by Ali Zafar; the main lead of the movie. Music was released on 14 February 2014 and was well received by Critics. Karthik writes "The title song Total Siyapaa along with the quirky lyrics, dialogues and sounds, is good fun. Ali Zafar fares really well in Palat Meri jaan, singing, writing and composing the lovely ballad. Palat Meri Jaan is a Chart buster. Nahi maloom has a captivating Middle-Eastern + Latino blend sound and is sung particularly well by Ali and Fariha Parvaiz. The composer-singer uses a reggae template in Asha and delivers a nice, winsome song. Chal Buleya is sufi song with a message. Barring that minor misstep, charming soundtrack overall, with Ali offering a good demonstration of his multi-facetedness."

See also
Bollywood films of 2014
Ali Zafar discography
Huqa Pani
Masty
Jhoom

References

External links 
 
 

2014 films
Indian romantic comedy films
2014 romantic comedy films
2010s Hindi-language films
India–Pakistan relations in popular culture
Films scored by Sanjoy Chowdhury
Indian remakes of Spanish films
Reliance Entertainment films
Films directed by Eeshwar Nivas